"Dinero" is a song by American singer Jennifer Lopez featuring American record producer DJ Khaled and American rapper Cardi B. It was written by Charles Anderson, Tommy Brown, Mohombi Moupondo, Yei Gonzalez, Danielle Curiel, Alexander Prado, Jermaine Denny, DJ Khaled, Cardi B and Luis Kalaff, and produced by Scott Desmarais, Brown and DJ Khaled and co-produced by Moupondo and Gonzalez. "Dinero" was released on all digital and streaming platforms on May 17, 2018, by  Epic Records. The song was nominated for Choice Latin Song at the 2018 Teen Choice Awards and its official music video received two nominations for Best Latin Video and Best Collaboration at the 2018 MTV Video Music Awards, winning the latter.

Background
"Dinero" is Lopez's first English single since "Us". Lopez first heard "Dinero" in early 2017 when it was sent to her by Cory Rooney, a record producer with whom she had worked frequently in her early career, who felt that it would be good for her. She was receptive of the track, and in the months that followed suggested to her manager Benny Medina that rapper Cardi B be featured on the record. Lopez, who had followed Cardi B prior to her breakthrough with "Bodak Yellow", said: "I just thought she had a street intelligence that I liked, and she had a logic that just made me laugh and reminded me of girls from the Bronx." Later, record producer DJ Khaled offered to provide further production for "Dinero", and the song was finished by December 2017. That month, a video of Lopez and Khaled working together in the studio was posted to Instagram, which hinted that the singer had collaborated with Cardi B. A short snippet of the song surfaced online in January 2018, and Lopez subsequently confirmed that it was titled "Dinero" the following month. Khaled stated: "Everything's top secret, [but] I can tell you this: J.Lo's got some new music coming [...] I want to thank J.Lo for letting me be one of the producers amongst other great ones, and a feature on the record. I'm grateful."

Composition
"Dinero" is a Latin trap song with a production that consists of synths, drums and an "occasional" acoustic guitar lick. "Dinero", which translates in English to "Money", features Lopez rapping. Lopez opens the song with the introduction: "Me and Benjamín Franco stay at the  / Getting checks like Nike, everywhere that I go", and in the hook declares: "" ("I want, I want money"). Cardi B's verse includes the lyric: "Two bad bitches that came from the Bronx / Cardi from the pole and Jenny from the block", a reference to the Bronx, where both Lopez and Cardi originate from, and Cardi's former stripper career. Khaled can be heard throughout the track, acting as a hype man.

Critical reception
Abby Jones of Billboard described "Dinero" as a "fiery proclamation of everyone's love for cold hard cash that's brimming with witty bilingual word play." The Guardian characterized the song as "a hustler's anthem", adding: "And not to mention the fact that J-Lo raps on this song with, 'They say money talk, but my talking bilingual', as her best bar." Similarly, XXL called it a "fiery anthem" and "potential banger". Vogue writer Michelle Ruiz praised the song as a potential summer hit, and felt that "Dinero" is "sort of like the 2018 answer" to Lopez's 2002 lead single from her third studio album titled This Is Me... Then, "Jenny from the Block". Likewise, Mike Nied of Idolator opined that "'Dinero' could easily dominate the charts this summer", writing: "Khaled’s production grows under her voice and builds to a steady fizz that is sure to fill dance floors across the globe, and Cardi brings the fire for her verse."

Music video

Official video 
The music video for "Dinero" was shot in April 2018. In the clip that surfaced online in December 2017, Lopez and Khaled could be heard discussing a concept for the video, with Khaled noting that "The video idea is gonna make the record even more crazier." Lopez said: "It's cinematic. It has those themes. I was just trying to connect it to the song where it's just not the typical reggaeton, bachata, hip-hop video that everybody does all the time." Directed by Joseph Kahn, the music video was shot entirely in black-and-white. It was released on May 24, 2018. Lopez sported 13 different looks and wore US$4.5 million worth of jewelry from Tiffany & Co.

Slant Magazine listed "Dinero" as one of the "100 Best Music Videos of the 2010s", with Alexa Camp writing that, "the black-and-white clip brazenly takes the piss out of Lopez’s dubious Jenny from the Block persona—and she’s clearly in on the joke, bowling with a diamond-covered ball, barbecuing in lingerie and pearls while sipping a crystal-encrusted Slurpee, toasting marshmallows over a burning pile of cash, and walking a preening pet ostrich on a leash."

Alternate video 
An alternate versions of the video, a vertical video directed by Steven Gomillion, was released exclusively on Spotify, on June 12, 2018. In the video, Lopez cruises through Las Vegas in a convertible, lip-syncing along to the song.

Live performances
Lopez first previewed the song during her set at Calibash in January 2018, which took place at the Staples Center in Los Angeles. She included it as part of a dance medley with "Bitch Better Have My Money" by Rihanna and "Bodak Yellow" by Cardi B. Lopez officially performed "Dinero" for the first time at the 2018 Billboard Music Awards which took place at the MGM Grand Garden Arena on May 20. She wore a "bedazzled" bustier and white pants, later sporting a white blazer and fedora to complete the look. She was surrounded by a group of "'40s era gangster-styled dancers". Khaled, surrounded by piles of money, appeared on a separate stage to introduce Lopez; Cardi B was not present due to her pregnancy, but appeared via a black-and-white video. Leila Cobo of Billboard said the performance was "ridiculously fun to watch", calling it "a lot of bling, a lot of style, some kick-ass dancing (JLo does not disappoint) and a whole lotta cash flying around". Refinery29 writer Kathryn Lindsay stated that "the multi-hyphenate proved she's going back to her roots with a passionate and colorful performance", but noted: "The one thing people didn't like about the performance? DJ Khaled. The artist was there, seemingly, to throw around money and yell some of his signature phrases during the song, but fans just wanted more J.Lo." Lopez and Khaled later performed "Dinero" as part of Lopez's medley during the 2018 MTV Video Music Awards on August 20, 2018, at Radio City Music Hall in New York City, where she was also awarded the Michael Jackson Video Vanguard Award. Lopez performed the song for Today, at Rockefeller Plaza on May 6, 2019, in New York City as part of the shows Citi Concert Series. Lopez was the opening act and kicked off the event performing the song as part of a medley that also included "Medicine" (2019), "Jenny from the Block" (2002) and "On the Floor" (2011).

Personnel
Credits adapted from Tidal.

 Scott Desmarais – production
 Tommy Brown – production
 Mohombi Moupondo – co-production
 Khaled Khaled – production, vocals
 Yei Gonzalez – co-production
 Belcalis Almanzar – vocals
 Manny Marroquin – mix engineering
 Jennifer Lopez – vocals
 Robin Florent – engineering assistance
 Scott Desmarals – production assistance
 Trevor Muzzy – record engineering
 Juan "AyoJuan" Peña – record engineering
 Cory Rooney - executive production
 Eric "eDoubleMUSIC" Erickson - record engineering

Charts

Certifications

Release history

See also
List of Billboard Hot Latin Songs and Latin Airplay number ones of 2018

References

2018 singles
2018 songs
Black-and-white music videos
Epic Records singles
Cardi B songs
DJ Khaled songs
Jennifer Lopez songs
Macaronic songs
Music videos directed by Joseph Kahn
Song recordings produced by Tommy Brown (record producer)
Songs written by Tommy Brown (record producer)
Songs written by Mohombi
Songs written by DJ Khaled
Songs written by Cardi B